"Alberta" is the title of several traditional blues songs.

Lead Belly song

Lead Belly recorded four different version of "Alberta".  One of these was recorded in New York on January 23, 1935 (for ARC Records, which did not issue it), and a similar version was recorded in New York on June 15, 1940 (included on Leadbelly: Complete Recorded Works, vol. 1, 1 April 1939 to 15 June 1940).  Another version, recorded in Wilton, Connecticut, on January 20, 1935, included the lyrics "Take me, Alberta, take me down in your rocking chair" and is included on Gwine Dig a Hole to Put the Devil In (Rounder Records, Library of Congress Recordings, vol. 2).  Lead Belly's fourth recorded version survives on recording disc BC-122 of the Mary Elizabeth Barnicle–Tillman Cadle Collection at East Tennessee State University, recorded near the date of June 15, 1948, with which several related discs are labeled.

Wheeler 1944 song
Mary Wheeler, in her Steamboatin' Days: Folk Songs of the River Packet Era (Baton Rouge, La.: Louisiana State University Press, 1944), records a song she collected from Gabriel "Uncle Gabe" Hester, with the lyrics:

Alberta, let yo' hair hang low,
Alberta, let yo' hair hang low,
I'll give you mo' gold than yo' apron will hold,
Ef you'll jes' let yo' hair hang low.

Alberta, what's on yo' mind?
Alberta, what's on yo' mind?
You keep me worried, you keep me bothered, all the time.
Alberta, what's on yo' mind?

Alberta, don't you treat me unkind,
Alberta, don't you treat me unkind,
'Cause I'm worried, 'cause I'm bothered, all the time.
Alberta, don't you treat me unkind.

Wheeler also reports Hester's reminiscences of the steamboat work songs he had sung as a roustabout in his younger days.  However, Wheeler's account does not explicitly give any evidence for Roger McGuinn's statement that, "This is a song sung by the stevedores who worked on the Ohio River."

The song became popular in the American folk music revival. 
Bob Gibson recorded it for his Carnegie Concert (1957), and it was included on Sing Out!, vol. 8, no. 3 (1959).
 Jerry Silverman, Folk Blues, vol. 1 (c. 1959)
 Burl Ives, with the title "Lenora, Let Your Hair Hang Down, The Versatile Burl Ives! (1961)
 Chad Mitchell Trio, At the Bitter End (1962)
 Odetta, under the title "Roberta," Odetta Sings Folk Songs (1963)
 Valentine Pringle, I Hear America Singing (1963)
 Pernell Roberts, Come All Ye Fair and Tender Ladies (1963)
 Blues Project, Live at The Cafe Au Go Go (1966, recorded live 1965)
 Doc Watson, Southbound (1966)
 Actor Kiel Martin played a soulful version of this song in the Season 6 episode entitled "Hell Wind" of the American Western TV series The Virginian, accompanying himself on acoustic guitar, in 1968.  Aside from this television episode, the performance remains unreleased on music media. 
 Bob Dylan, two versions, Self Portrait (1970)
 Eric Clapton, Slowhand (1977)

See also
 Corrine, Corrina

References

External links
 Alberta, Let Your Hair Hang Low (CSU Fresno Traditional Ballad Index)

1935 songs
American folk songs
Blues songs
Lead Belly songs
Burl Ives songs
Odetta songs
Doc Watson songs
Bob Dylan songs